Dušan Tešić (born 16 July 1988) is a Serbian football forward, who last played for Spartak Subotica in the Serbian SuperLiga.

Honours
Mladost
Serbian First League: 2013–14

References

External links
 
 Dušan Tešić stats at utakmica.rs 
 

1988 births
Living people
Footballers from Belgrade
Association football forwards
Serbian footballers
OFK Mladenovac players
FK Zemun players
FK Mladost Lučani players
FK Spartak Subotica players
Serbian SuperLiga players